Zarkadia is a village and a community in the municipal unit of Chrysoupoli in the Kavala regional unit, Greece. The community consists of the villages Zarkadia and Ekali.). Zakardia and Ekali had a population of 598 and 73 respectively at the 2011 census.

References

 

Populated places in Kavala (regional unit)